Rao Ching-ling (born 23 November 1969) is a Taiwanese politician.

Education
Rao obtained her doctoral degree from National Taiwan Normal University in political science.

Political career
Rao was elected to the Taitung County Council after winning the local election on 3 December 2005, making her the youngest councilor to be elected at the age of 36. In 2010, she was elected as the speaker of the county council.

While serving on the county council, Rao explored bids for higher office, contesting Kuang Li-chen for the Taitung magistracy in 2009, and a seat on the Legislative Yuan in 2012. In 2016, Rao was appointed a deputy secretary-general of the Kuomintang, under chairwoman Hung Hsiu-chu.

2018 Taitung County magistrate election
Rao defeated Liao Kuo-tung in a Kuomintang primary and subsequently received her party's nomination to contest the Taitung magistracy in 2018.

She faced Democratic Progressive Party challenger Liu Chao-hao and three independent candidates, including former county commissioner Kuang Li-chen. Rao won the magisterial election held on 24 November 2018.

References

External links

 

1969 births
Living people
Magistrates of Taitung County
National Taiwan Normal University alumni
21st-century Taiwanese women politicians
21st-century Taiwanese politicians